Georgina Kristine Noelle Kingsley (born 15 March 1993 in Ascot, Berkshire), most commonly known by her stage name Georgi Kay, is an English-born Australian indie pop musician, currently based in Los Angeles.

Biography
Georgi Kay began playing lead guitar for rock group, The Vains, at the age of fourteen. Within a year she also took on the lead vocal duties. By 2009, Kay was playing solo shows and recording some of her original material for release.

Kay released her debut EP, Strange Things in March 2010.

In 2010, Kay became the youngest ever winner of the WAM Song of the Year Award, winning in 2010 with "Breakfast in Bedlam". In 2011 Kay won another WAM Song of the Year Award for her collaboration "Free" with The Stoops.

In May 2011 Kay released her debut album, Backwardsforwards.

Kay wrote and featured on the track "In My Mind", released on Axtone Records in January 2012, in collaboration with Australian house music producers Feenixpawl and Ivan Gough. Flo Rida released a remix titled "In My Mind, Part II". The track marks Kay's first appearance on a major label international album. "In My Mind" was chosen by KIA Motors for their 2013 US advertising campaign titled "Bringing Down The House" and the launch video made its debut on over 18,000 movie screens during the MTV Video Music Awards on 6 September.

In February 2012, Kay played the role of Melissa in the Jane Campion directed television miniseries, Top of the Lake, filmed in Otago, New Zealand. In the penultimate episode, she performs a cover of the song "Jóga" by Björk, and in the final episode one of her own original songs, "Ipswich".

At the ARIA Music Awards of 2012, "In My Mind" won the ARIA Award for Best Dance Release. At the APRA Music Awards of 2013, "In My Mind" won Dance Work of the Year.

In December 2014, Kay wrote, produced and recorded "Head Full of Lies" as the theme music for the opening/closing credits for the three-part Netflix dystopian miniseries Residue. At the ARIA Music Awards of 2015, "Head Full of Lies" was nominated for Best Original Song Composed for the Screen.

In December 2015, she released the single "God of a Girl" from her EP Origins. In February 2016 she released the single "More Than This". Origins was released in February 2016.

In 2017, Kay wrote, produced and recorded "Mark VI" in collaboration with Charles Scott IV as the theme music/closing credits for Sleight, the American science fiction drama film about a street magician in Los Angeles. The film, directed by J. D. Dillard, written by Dillard and Alex Theurer and starring Jacob Latimore, Seychelle Gabriel, Dulé Hill, Storm Reid, Sasheer Zamata and Michael Villar. The film was released on 28 April 2017, by WWE Studios and Blumhouse Tilt. The film received mixed reviews from critics and grossed $4 million worldwide, against its $250,000 budget.

In early 2018, Kay wrote, recorded and produced the track "Lone Wolf" in Los Angeles. In November 2018, the album Where I Go to Disappear was released.

Discography

Albums

Extended plays

Singles

As lead artist

As featured artist

Awards and nominations

APRA Awards
The APRA Awards are presented annually from 1982 by the Australasian Performing Right Association (APRA), "honouring composers and songwriters".

|-
| rowspan="2" | 2013 
| "In My Mind" (Aden Forte, Ivan Gough, Georgi Kay, Joshua Soon) 
| Dance Work of the Year 
| 
|-
| "In My Mind (Part 2)" (Tramar Dillard, Aden Forte, Ivan Gough,Georgi Kay, Joshua Soon)  (performed by Flo Rida)
| Urban Work of the Year 
| 
|-
| 2015 
| "Head Full of Lies" (Georgi Kay, James Earp) (for Residue) 
| Best Original Song Composed for the Screen
| 
|-

ARIA Music Awards
The ARIA Music Awards is an annual awards ceremony that recognises excellence, innovation, and achievement across all genres of Australian music.

|-
| 2012
| "In My Mind" by Ivan Gough and Feenixpawl featuring Georgi Kay
| ARIA Award for Best Dance Release
| 
|-

WAM Song of the Year
The WAM Song of the Year was formed by the  Western Australian Rock Music Industry Association Inc. (WARMIA) in 1985, with its main aim to develop and run annual awards recognising achievements within the music industry in Western Australia.

 (wins only)
|-
| rowspan="2" | 2010
| rowspan="2" | "Breakfast in Bedlam"
| Schools 15-17 Yrs 
| 
|-
| Grand Prize 
| 
|-
| 2011
| rowspan="2" | "Free (The Stoops featuring Georgi Kay)
| Urban / Hip Hop 
| 
|-

References

External links
 

1993 births
Living people
APRA Award winners
ARIA Award winners
Australian dance musicians
Australian pop musicians
Australian women guitarists
Australian songwriters
English emigrants to Australia
People from Ascot, Berkshire
Musicians from Perth, Western Australia
21st-century Australian singers
21st-century Australian women singers
21st-century guitarists
Musicians from Berkshire
21st-century women guitarists